The 1970 Tour de Romandie was the 24th edition of the Tour de Romandie cycle race and was held from 6 May to 10 May 1970. The race started in Geneva and finished in Lausanne. The race was won by Gösta Pettersson.

General classification

References

1970
Tour de Romandie
Tour de Romandie